Gelanor moyobamba is a species of neotropical spiders from Peru in the family Mimetidae.

References

Mimetidae
Spiders described in 2016
Spiders of South America